The 2015 BWF Season was the overall badminton circuit organized by the Badminton World Federation (BWF) for the 2015 badminton season to publish and promote the sport. Besides the BWF World Championships, BWF promotes the sport of badminton through an extensive worldwide programme of events in four structure levels.  They are the individual tournaments called Super Series, Grand Prix Events, International Challenge and International Series.  Besides the individual tournaments, team events such as Thomas Cup & Uber Cup and Sudirman Cup are held every other year.

The 2015 BWF season calendar comprises the World Championships tournaments, the Sudirman Cup, the BWF Super Series (Super Series, Super Series Premier, Super Series Finals), the Grand Prix (Grand Prix Gold and Grand Prix), the International Series (International Series and International Challenge), and BWF Future Series.

Schedule
This is the complete schedule of events on the 2015 calendar, with the Champions and Runners-up documented.
Key

January

February

March

April

May

June

July

August

September

October

November

December

See also
BWF World Ranking

References

2015 in badminton
Badminton World Federation seasons